The 1929 FA Charity Shield was the 16th FA Charity Shield, an annual football match.  It was played between the Professionals and the Amateurs at The Den, New Cross in London on 7 October 1929.  The Professionals won the match 3–0.

Teams

Match
The Professionals won 3–0 with goals from Seed, Chandler and Pease.

References

FA Community Shield
Charity Shield
Charity Shield
FA Charity Shield